The Pittsburgh Southern Railway was a railroad in the U.S. state of Pennsylvania.  It was formed in March 1879 by the merger of the  narrow gauge Pittsburgh Southern Railroad (which was the  narrow gauge Pittsburgh, Castle Shannon and Washington Railroad from July 1877 to April 1878), Pittsburgh Railroad, and Washington Railroad. It ran from Washington to Castle Shannon, where it connected to the Pittsburgh and Castle Shannon Railroad. An attempt to use the  Little Saw Mill Run Railroad as a substitute connection to Pittsburgh using dual gauge track led to the Castle Shannon Railroad War of 1878.

References

History of Allegheny County, Pennsylvania
Transportation in Washington County, Pennsylvania
Defunct Pennsylvania railroads
Transportation in Pittsburgh
Narrow gauge railroads in Pennsylvania
3 ft gauge railways in the United States
Predecessors of the Baltimore and Ohio Railroad
Railway companies established in 1879
Railway companies disestablished in 1884
Defunct West Virginia railroads
American companies disestablished in 1884
American companies established in 1879